Bache-Wiig is a Norwegian surname. Notable people with the surname include:

 Anna Bache-Wiig (born 1975), Norwegian actress and screenwriter
 Jens Bache-Wiig (1880–1965), Norwegian engineer
 Sara Bache-Wiig (1894–1971), Norwegian-born American mycologist and botany professor

Surnames of Norwegian origin
Compound surnames